Josephus Serré (3 February 1907 – 14 December 1991) was a Dutch modern pentathlete. He competed at the 1936 Summer Olympics.

References

1907 births
1991 deaths
Dutch male modern pentathletes
Olympic modern pentathletes of the Netherlands
Modern pentathletes at the 1936 Summer Olympics
Sportspeople from Bergen op Zoom